is a Japanese football manager and former player. He currently manager of Wyvern FC.

Club career
Ogawa was born in Chiba on July 21, 1970. After graduating from high school, he joined Toyota Motors (later Nagoya Grampus Eight) in 1989. He played many matches as left side back from first season and became a regular player from 1991. The club won the champions 1995 first major title in his history. In Asia, the club also won the 2nd place 1996–97 Asian Cup Winners' Cup. In 1998, he could not play at all in the match for injury. In 1999, he came back and the club won the champions 1999 Emperor's Cup. He retired end of 2000 season.

Managerial career
On 1 January 2021, Ogawa begin career as assistant manager of Wyvern FC until 31 August 2021. One day later, he promoted to manager his club on same year. On 13 November 2022, Ogawa brought his club promotion to the Tōkai Soccer League Division 1 for the first time in history after 2021 season finished in runner-up as well Tōkai Soccer League Division 2 champions.

Club statistics

Managerial statistics
.

Honours

Manager
 Wyvern FC
Tōkai Adult Soccer League Division 2 : 2022

References

External links

1970 births
Living people
Association football people from Chiba Prefecture
Japanese footballers
Japan Soccer League players
J1 League players
Nagoya Grampus players
Association football defenders
Japanese football managers